Amagansett is a station on the Montauk Branch of the Long Island Rail Road, at Main Street (NY 27) and Abrahms Landing Road (former Suffolk CR 33A) in Amagansett, New York.

History

Amagansett station was opened on June 1, 1895, by the Brooklyn and Montauk Railroad, and closely resembled stations such as Sea Cliff and the former East Williston Depot, but lacked the second story and gingerbread woodwork trim that these depots contained. It was burned to the ground in 1909, reportedly by a disgruntled LIRR employee. The station was rebuilt on August 15, 1910, in the colonial barn style typical of stations such as Riverhead, Bay Shore, Northport, and Mineola. Until 1929, it had train sheds, a wye, and coal and water dispensing facilities. On June 13, 1942, Nazi saboteurs used Amagansett station en route to New York City for the failed mission known as Operation Pastorius. The station house was closed in 1958 or January 1959, then razed on August 31, 1964, and replaced with a sheltered platform in 1965. The 1895-built former freight house survives, but was abandoned. A high-level platform was added in the late 1990s, as many stations along the Long Island Rail Road were getting at the time.

Station layout
This station has one high-level platform on the south side of the single track, long enough for two cars to receive and discharge passengers.

References

External links

Amagansett Station -- By Rail To The Sea (Arrt's Arrchives)
Unofficial LIRR History Website
1911 Postcard
1910s Painting
March 2000 (Current Amagansett Station)
Unofficial LIRR Photography Site (lirrpics.com)
Amagansett Station

Long Island Rail Road stations in Suffolk County, New York
East Hampton (town), New York
Railway stations in the United States opened in 1895